Saleem Sherwani may refer to:

 Saleem Sherwani (field hockey forward), Pakistan field hockey player who played in 1984 Summer Olympics
 Saleem Sherwani (field hockey goalkeeper), Pakistani field hockey goal keeper who participated in 1972 Summer Olympics

See also
Sherwani (surname)